Juliana Rojas is a Brazilian filmmaker who was born in Campinas, São Paulo (June 23, 1981). She graduated in Cinema in Escola de Comunicação e Artes da USP (School of Communication and Arts of University of São Paulo) where she met fellow Brazilian filmmaker Marco Dutra. This was the beginning of a long partnership between them. In 2004, while still in school, they codirected a short film called Lenço Branco. Their short film was part of a section of the Cannes Film Festival that is dedicated to university films, Cinéfondation. Three years later, in 2007, Um Ramo, another short film directed by Rojas and Dutra, would be nominated to Semaine de la Critique of Cannes Film Festival. In 2011, her first feature film would be premiered in the Festival, in the  "Un Certain Regard" section. Her film, Good Manners was nominated in 2017 at the Locarno Film Festival. She has also worked as an editor.

Career 
She graduated from USP in 2005, with specialization in Editing, Screenplay and Sound (1999-2005). Juliana Roja started her career while she was still in school. According to an interview with her, she said yet on the first year of college she became close friends with Marco Dutra and realized both had shared interests such as scary movies, animation, musicals.  She directed her first film with Dutra in 2004, a short movie called Lenço Branco as their final assignment project for school. In the same year, it was part of Cinéfondation in Cannes Film Festival.

This event brought attention to the duo. In 2007, they directed another short film Um Ramo and was nominated to Semaine de la Critique and won Best Short Film. Um Ramo was made with government of São Paulo funding, through an "Edital" (public notice) and produced by Sara Silveira from Dezenove Som e Imagens production company. Juliana Rojas had the opportunity to meet Sara Silveira through a friend in common. Um Ramo helped her get attention in her work and helped her find her aesthetics. It brings fantasy elements to portray urban life of nowadays middle class society and this characteristic is a constant in Juliana Roja and Marco Dutra’s work.

With Dutra, she codirected As Sombras, a short movie in 2009, and then Desassossego – filme das maravilhas in 2010. After being nominated for Best Short Film in Cannes (2007), Sara Silveira proposed that they brought a feature film screenplay project to show at the Festival. That is how, in 2011, Hard Labor would become Roja's first feature film and would get into the selection Un Certain Regard, in Cannes Film Festival. This film was nominated for ten categories in Prêmio Fiesp/Sesi-SP, such as Best Movie and Best Director. It featured a frequent actress in their work, Helena Albergaria, who was a longtime friend they met working with Cia. do Latão - a theater company in São Paulo - and Marat Descartes. Hard Labor was edited by Caetano Gotardo, to whom Roja would edit a film.

Together with Dutra, Roja won the Silver Leopard award in Locarno Festival with Good Manners, in 2017. However, Rojas did not base her career in only co-directed films with  Dutra, she also had some works directed by herself, such as: Vestida in 2008, Pra domir tranquilo in 2011 and O Duplo in 2012 – premiered in Cannes Film Festival and also in 16th Mostra de Cinema Tiradentes, 2013. In 2014, she won Critics Category Award in Gramado Film Festival with her feature film called Sinfonia da Necrópole.

Besides her directing career, she also used her skills as an editor in some important films in Brazilian Cinema, such as: documentary Pulsações (2011) directed by Manoela Ziggiati; Os dias com ele (2012) directed by Maria Clara Escobar and O sol nos meus olhos (2012) directed by Flora Dias, both shown in 16th Mostra de Cinema Tiradentes; TV movie Corpo Presente (2012) by Paolo Gregori and Marcelo Toledo; O que se move (2012) by Caetano Gotardo and Quando eu era vivo (2013) by her Cinema partner Marco Dutra.

Importance in Brazilian Cinema 
Rojas participated in very relevant Film Festivals. She has been showing her films in Cannes Film Festival in France since the beginning of her career. She also had her work shown in Locarno Film Festival and Gramado Film Festival. Rojas is one of the filmmakers of contemporary Brazilian Cinema investing in fantastic storytelling, using genres such as thriller, fantasy, drama to create a critical argument of contemporary Brazilian society. She has been compared to and listed with internationally known Brazilian filmmakers and films - as Neighboring Sounds by Kleber Mendonça Filho, for example.

Filmography

Awards and nominations 

 Cinéfondantion, Cannes (2004) with O Lenço Branco 
 Best Short Film in Semaine de la Critique, Cannes (2007) with Um Ramo
 Un Certain Regard, Cannes (2011) with Hard Labor 
 Nominated Best Movie, Best Director and 10 other categories in FIESP/SESI SP's prize (2012) with Hard Labor
Havana Star Prize for Best Screenplay, Havana Film Festival New York (2012) with Hard Labor
 Premiered O Duplo in Cannes Film Festival (2012) 
 Shown in Mostra de Cinema Tiradentes (2013) with O Duplo  
 Won Critics Category Award in Gramado Film Festival (2014) with Sinfonia da necrópole 
 Won Silver Leopard in Locarno Film Festival (2017) with Good Manners

External links 
 http://portacurtas.org.br/busca/specSearch.aspx?spec=diretor&artist=Juliana%20Rojas

References 

1981 births
Living people
Brazilian film directors
Brazilian film editors
Brazilian women film directors
Women film editors